Dreams in Colour is the third album released by Portuguese pop–rock singer David Fonseca. It was released in Portugal on October 8, 2007, to critical and commercial acclaim. Previously, the single "Superstars" had been released.
The second single was "Rocket Man (I Think It's Going To Be A Long, Long Time)" a cover version of Elton John and Bernie Taupin classic "Rocket Man". The video went out on November 17.
The third single, a slow-tempo one, "Kiss Me, Oh Kiss Me" received a considerable airplay on Portuguese radio stations.

Track listing

Personnel 

 David Fonseca – organ, synthesizer, acoustic guitar, percussion, piano, drums, electric guitar, keyboards, electric piano, tambourine, vocals, backing vocals, whistle, producer, engineer, cavaquinho, clapping, string arrangements, photography, cover art concept, Indian harmonium, beat programming
 Sergio "Visom" Nascimento – percussion, drums, backing vocals, clapping, shak
 Maria Salgado – backing vocals, clapping
 Howie Weinberg – mastering

DVD: Dreams in Colour: Tour Edition 

This is a DVD that contains the same 11-song track list as Dreams in Colour in addition to seven additional live tracks as follows:

"If Our Hearts Do Ache" (live)
"Song to the Siren" (live)
"Who Are U?" (live)
"R de Ryan"
  
"How Do You Keep Love Alive" (live)
"Let's Stick Together" (live)
"I'm On Fire" (live)

2007 albums
David Fonseca albums